Billbergia vittata is a plant species in the genus Billbergia. This species is native to Brazil.

Cultivars

 Billbergia 'Bismark'
 Billbergia 'Breauteana'
 Billbergia 'Calophylla'
 Billbergia 'Cappei'
 Billbergia 'Carminea'
 Billbergia 'Charles Webb'
 Billbergia 'Choc Chill'
 Billbergia 'Collevii'
 Billbergia 'Colores'
 Billbergia 'Dojo Master'
 Billbergia 'Domingos Martins'
 Billbergia 'El Jefe'
 Billbergia 'Franz Antoine'
 Billbergia 'Globrite'
 Billbergia 'Grey Mist'
 Billbergia 'Herbaultii'
 Billbergia 'Highlight'
 Billbergia 'Hilda Ariza'
 Billbergia 'Intermedia'
 Billbergia 'Joliboisii'
 Billbergia 'Joseph Marechal'
 Billbergia 'Lawrence'
 Billbergia 'Leodiensis'
 Billbergia 'Lissom'
 Billbergia 'Magic Grace'
 Billbergia 'Marechalii'
 Billbergia 'Medowie Dusk'
 Billbergia 'Misty Pink'
 Billbergia 'Misty Steel'
 Billbergia 'My Pleasure'
 Billbergia 'Oberthueri'
 Billbergia 'Olive Wills'
 Billbergia 'Penumbra'
 Billbergia 'Purple Smoke'
 Billbergia 'Raffle Prize'
 Billbergia 'Ralph Graham French'
 Billbergia 'Red Smoke'
 Billbergia 'Rhedonensis'
 Billbergia 'Rosea'
 Billbergia 'Salmon Gum'
 Billbergia 'Salmonea'
 Billbergia 'Silver Sheen'
 Billbergia 'Smoke & Fire'
 Billbergia 'Storm'
 Billbergia 'Touch of Grey'
 Billbergia 'Turbo'
 Billbergia 'Ultrajactensis'
 Billbergia 'Vittato-Nutans'
 Billbergia 'Wind & Thunder'
 Billbergia 'Windtalker'
 Billbergia 'Wittmackiana'
 Billbergia 'Zebrina Cappeana'
 × Cryptbergia 'Hombre'

References

BSI Cultivar Registry Retrieved 11 October 2009

vittata
Endemic flora of Brazil
Flora of the Atlantic Forest
Garden plants of South America
Taxa named by Adolphe-Théodore Brongniart